Carlos Amado Molina (born May 25, 1983) is a Mexican professional boxer. He is a former IBF light middleweight champion.

Amateur career
Molina started his amateur career at age eighteen, amassing a 6–1 record before turing professional after only two years.

Professional career
In December, 2005, Molina fought the undefeated Julio César Chávez, Jr. to a controversial draw, a fight which many observers felt Molina won. In February 2006, he lost to Chavez in a rematch by a six round majority decision. This bout was held at The Aladdin in Las Vegas, Nevada.

Molina then lost another majority decision, this time to Mike Alvarado, before scoring 9 consecutive wins, including a unanimous decision victory over Danny Perez for the WBO NABO light middleweight title. However, he would remain inactive for the following year and a half after a dispute with his promoter Don King.

On March 25, 2011, Molina fought undefeated Olympic gold medalist Erislandy Lara to a disputed majority draw — another fight which those at ringside thought Molina deserved. The final scores were 97-93 for Molina and 95-95 on the two other scorecards. Molina then scored a TKO victory over Allen Conyers.

In his next fight, Molina upset former world champion Kermit Cintron, on Showtime.

On the undercard of the Floyd Mayweather-Canelo Alvarez superfight, on September 14, 2013, Molina defeated Ishe Smith  by split decision to win the IBF Junior Middleweight title.

Professional boxing record

See also
List of world light-middleweight boxing champions
List of Mexican boxing world champions

References

External links

1983 births
Living people
People from Pátzcuaro
Boxers from Michoacán
Mexican male boxers
Welterweight boxers
Light-middleweight boxers
Middleweight boxers
World light-middleweight boxing champions
International Boxing Federation champions